The Kpee language, Kpeego, commonly called Numu (Noumoukan), is a Mande language spoken by blacksmiths (numu) in Burkina Faso. It is thought to be similar to Ligbi in Ghana, but no comparison has been done.

References

Mande languages
Languages of Burkina Faso
Blacksmiths